Mikaelin 'Blue' Bluespruce is an American, New York City based mix engineer and record producer.  He has worked with notable artists of many different genres including: Solange Knowles, Nas, Lin-Manuel Miranda, Skepta, Dev Hynes, Marsha Ambrosius, Alloe Blacc, Common, & Prince Royce.

Blue was one of the primary recording engineers, and the mixing engineer for Solange's critically acclaimed A Seat At The Table album, which debuted at number one on the Billboard Top 200 Albums chart.  Blue was awarded a Grammy certificate for his work on the Cranes In The Sky, which won a Grammy for "Best R&B Performance" at the 2017 Grammy Awards.

For The Hamilton Mixtape, Blue mixed songs for Hip Hop artists  Nas, Dave East, Common & Black Thought, as well as famed soul singer Alloe Blacc, and Lin-Manuel Miranda, the creator and star of Broadway's Hamilton. The mixtape also debuted at number one on the Billboard Top 200.

Biography 
Blue moved to New York from Seattle at the age of 18, as a DJ with aspirations of becoming a studio engineer.  In 2006 he graduated with Honors from New York University's program for Music Technology, and worked as an intern at Jay-Z & Just Blaze's Baseline Studios.  After doing years of freelance work in studios such as Quad and Sony, he took the position of Head Engineer at Lounge Studios, in midtown Manhattan.

Selected discography
Taken from Allmusic

Mariah Carey - Caution

Blood Orange - Negro Swan

tUnE-yArDs - I Can Feel You Creep Into My Private Life

Lin-Manuel Miranda - Almost Like Praying

Sir The Baptist - Saint or Sinner

Various Artists - The Hamilton Mixtape

Solange - A Seat At The Table

Blood Orange - Freetown Sound

Skepta - Konnichiwa

Carly Rae Jepsen - EMOTION

Blood Orange - Cupid Deluxe

Solange Knowles - Saint Heron Compilation

Solange Knowles  – True

Marsha Ambrosius – Late Nights & Early Mornings

Prince Royce – Prince Royce

Cheryl Cole – 3 Words

Thao & The Get Down Stay Down – Temple

References

American audio engineers
Record producers from New York (state)
Living people
Steinhardt School of Culture, Education, and Human Development alumni
Businesspeople from New York City
Businesspeople from Seattle
Place of birth missing (living people)
Year of birth missing (living people)
Engineers from New York City